This is a list of Coronation Street characters that made their first appearance in 1983.

Damian Ogden

Damian Ogden was the son of Trevor (Don Hawkins) and Polly Ogden (Mary Tamm) and grandson of Stan (Bernard Youens) and Hilda Ogden (Jean Alexander).

Damian was born in 1973, during which time Stan and Hilda were estranged from their son and did not know he was married. Polly and Trevor lived in a detached house in Chesterfield, far removed from the working class community Trevor ran away from when he was fifteen. Stan and Hilda re-entered his life at Christmas of 1973, when they tracked him down and they were thrilled to learn that they were grandparents again (their first grandchild, Darren Barlow, was killed in a road accident in 1970). Subsequently, Stan and Hilda were only contacted when the younger Ogdens wanted something, such as in December 1975 when Hilda was called on to look after Trevor and Damian while a heavily pregnant Polly was in hospital with toxaemia. A month later, Damian's younger sister Jayne was born.

In June 1983, Trevor brought Damian to Weatherfield to stay with Stan and Hilda while he went to Chester for a job interview. The Ogdens were pleased to have Damian although Stan suspected Trevor had a hidden agenda as they'd recently received an inheritance from Hilda's brother, Archie Crabtree (John Stratton). Hilda hoped Stan was wrong but Trevor did indeed ask for a loan the next day, which Hilda refused.

In October 1986, Hilda was drafted in again when Trevor and Polly went on holiday for two weeks

Curly Watts

Terry Duckworth

Percy Sugden

Percy Sugden played by Bill Waddington. He appeared between 1983 and 1997. The character was introduced to Coronation Street as a potential caretaker of the Community Centre. Percy's niece, Elaine Prior, stayed with him until she married Bill Webster (Peter Armitage). Percy was also a school traffic warden, and Phyllis Pearce (Jill Summers) came to respect him greatly after he was injured trying to protect her.

Shirley Armitage

Kevin Webster

Kevin John Webster is a fictional character in the UK television ITV soap opera Coronation Street. Portrayed by actor Michael Le Vell, the character first appeared onscreen during the episode airing on 19 October 1983. Le Vell was suspended from the soap in 2013 due to allegations of sexual offences, with scenes he had already filmed cut from broadcast. Le Vell was found not guilty of all charges in September 2013, and briefly returned in early 2014, before taking another 3-month break from the show and returning once again.

Mark Redman

Mark Redman (also Dunlop) made his first appearance on 31 October 1983. He is the son of long-running character Mike Baldwin and Maggie Dunlop. He was played by Thomas Hawkeswood from 1983 till 1984, by Christopher Oakes in 1986, Michael Bolstridge in 1991 and then by Christopher Cook from 1992 till 1996 and then most recently Paul Fox from 1999 till 2006. He first appeared during the episode airing on 31 October 1983 and last appeared on 17 April 2006.

Maggie married Harry Redman soon after splitting up with Mike and Harry brought up Mark as his son. Mike found out about Mark after Harry's death and he started interfering with Mark's and his mother's lives, paying for Mark to go to Oakhill Grammar School and alienating him from his old friends. Mark was relieved to move to Felixstowe when his mother remarried.

After leaving school, Mark returned to Weatherfield in 1999 to see his father and stayed for a while, helping out in the factory, but fell in love with Mike's fiancée, Linda Sykes. They began an affair in the new year and both became partners in the company. Mark tried to make it work but it was too much and he eventually decided to leave Weatherfield again, for Amsterdam, agreeing to return for the wedding. When he did, the secret came out on the wedding day and Mike was furious. He told Mark to leave and never come back. While things went on to be slightly friendlier between them, their relationship never entirely recovered and Mark moved to Holland soon after.

By 2006, Mark was living with his girlfriend in Doncaster and estranged from his father. He was shocked to find a confused Mike on his doorstep, unaware that his father now had Alzheimer's disease. Mike initially believed Mark to be his youngest son, Mike later remembered that Adam Barlow was his youngest son, but upon remembering Mark's affair with Linda, he left. Later that week, Mike died of a heart attack and Mark attended his funeral from a distance. Afterwards, he visited the factory and introduced himself to Adam. When Adam explained that Mike's older son Danny Baldwin had used Mike's illness to get him to leave him everything in his will, Mark urged Adam to contest it.

References

, 1983
, Coronation Street
Coronation Street